Stefan Voigt (born 19 August 1962) is a German economist and one of the Directors of the University of Hamburg's Institute of Law and Economics. He is also a Fellow of CESifo in Munich.

Previous positions include chairs at the Philipps-University Marburg, the University of Kassel, the Ruhr University Bochum, a fellowship at the Wissenschaftskolleg zu Berlin, a senior fellowship at the Krupp Kolleg in Greifswald and a research fellowship at the Max Planck Institute of Economics in Jena.

Voigt's research focus is on institutional economics. He has a particular interest in the economic analysis of public law in general and constitutional law in particular. He has published textbooks in German and English in these fields. His particular research interest is the economic effects of judicial institutions and the economics of human rights. Voigt has published around 100 papers in peer-reviewed journals such as the Journal of Economic Behavior and Organization, the Journal of Development Economics and the Journal of Comparative Economics,

Currently, Voigt is the co-editor of Constitutional Political Economy  is a member  of the editorial board of Public Choice and International Review of Law & Economics.

He was born in Hamburg, Germany.

References 

1962 births
Living people
20th-century  German  economists
Academic staff of the University of Hamburg
Academic staff of the University of Kassel
Academic staff of Ruhr University Bochum
21st-century German male writers
20th-century German male writers
Academic staff of the University of Marburg